Spurilla braziliana is a species of sea slug, an aeolid nudibranch. It is a shell-less marine gastropod mollusc in the family Aeolidiidae.

Distribution
This species was described from a single specimen collected at Alagoas, Brazil. It has also been reported from the Caribbean Sea, Florida, Mexico, Colombia, Cuba, Jamaica, Puerto Rico, and in the northern part of the Magellanic Province. It has been identified from the Pacific Ocean including the Hawaiian Islands, the Pacific coast of Costa Rica, Peru, Japan, China, and Australia.<ref name=carmona>Carmona L., Pola M., Gosliner T.M. & Cervera J.L. (2013). [http://www.plosone.org/article/info%3Adoi%2F10.1371%2Fjournal.pone.0063000 A tale that morphology fails to tell: A molecular phylogeny of Aeolidiidae (Aeolidida, Nudibranchia, Gastropoda).] PLoS ONE 8(5): e63000. doi:10.1371/journal.pone.0063000.</ref>

DescriptionSpurilla braziliana'' is variable in colour, with this variation being correlated with age.

References

Aeolidiidae
Gastropods described in 1909